Cornman may refer to:

 Cornman: American Vegetable Hero, a 2001 film directed by Barak Epstein
 "Cornman," a song on the album Kinky by Kinky
 Evans v. Cornman (1970), United States Supreme Court case